The 200-metre backstroke event is an event held at the Summer Olympic Games. The men's event was introduced in 1900, then was not held again until 1964, with a 100-metre backstroke) held from 1904 to 1960. When the event returned in 1964, it replaced the men's 100-metre backstroke for that year; in 1968, both the 100- and 200-metre versions were held for men. The 200-metre backstroke has been held at every Summer Games since 1964. The women's backstroke was introduced in 1968, and it has been held at every Summer Olympics since.

Medals

Men's medals

Men's multiple medalists

Men's medalists by nation

Women's medals

Women's multiple medalists

Women's medalists by nation

References

Olympic swimming events
200 metre backstroke at the Olympics